Janice Clare Filmon  ( Wainwright; born ) is a Canadian former social worker who served as the 25th lieutenant governor of Manitoba from 2015 to 2022. Her appointment became effective June 19, 2015. She was the viceregal representative of Queen Elizabeth II and King Charles III of Canada in the Province of Manitoba.

Early life
Filmon was born around 1943. A social worker, philanthropist and community activist, she was made a member of the Order of Canada in 2012 and the Order of Manitoba in 2007. She is the chair of the CancerCare Manitoba Foundation and founder of the A Leadership Initiative in Voluntary Efforts (A.L.I.V.E.) volunteer program. She was born in Winnipeg and was a 1964 graduate from the University of Manitoba with a Bachelor of Science degree in home economics. Her husband is Gary Filmon, a former premier of Manitoba; they have four children.

Lieutenant Governor
On March 19, 2015, Filmon was appointed by Governor General of Canada David Johnston on the advice of Prime Minister Stephen Harper to be the next Lieutenant Governor of Manitoba, replacing Philip S. Lee. As the viceregal representative in Manitoba, she was styled "Her Honour" while in office and will have the right to the style "the Honourable" for life.

Arms and honours

Coat of arms 
Filmon was granted a coat of arms through Grant of Arms and Supporters, with differences to Allison Joy Filmon, David Clark Filmon, Gregg Alan Filmon and Susanna Clare Filmon, on May 15, 2019.

References

Living people
1940s births
Lieutenant Governors of Manitoba
Members of the Order of Canada
Members of the Order of Manitoba
Politicians from Winnipeg
Canadian women viceroys
21st-century Canadian politicians
21st-century Canadian women politicians